Cubanops is a genus of Caribbean araneomorph spiders in the family Caponiidae first described by A. Sánchez-Ruiz, Norman I. Platnick & N. Dupérré in 2010. These spiders are wandering hunters, generally found at ground level, under stones, in leaf litter or in the soil, and have only been found in the West Indies.

Description
Although specimens have only been recorded from the Bahamas, Cuba, and Hispaniola, a few female juvenile specimens sharing the somatic characters of the genus have been taken from Saint John Parish, Antigua and Barbuda, suggesting that Cubanops probably also occurs in Puerto Rico as well as the Virgin Islands.

These spiders have tarsi that are subsegmented as well as a ventral translucent keel on their anterior metatarsi. They also have a translucent membrane connecting the anterior metatarsi and tarsi similar to those found in Nops, Orthonops, and Tarsonops. Species of Cubanops can be distinguished from species of Nops by the lack of a dorsally extended inferior claw found in Nops species. They can be distinguished from members of Orthonops and Tarsonops by the distinct chevron patterns on their carapace, their widened labium, and a bisegmented fourth metatarsi.

Species 
 it contains twelve species:
Cubanops alayoni Sánchez-Ruiz, Platnick & Dupérré, 2010 – Cuba
Cubanops andersoni Sánchez-Ruiz, Platnick & Dupérré, 2010 – Bahama Is.
Cubanops armasi Sánchez-Ruiz, Platnick & Dupérré, 2010 – Cuba
Cubanops bimini Sánchez-Ruiz, Platnick & Dupérré, 2010 – Bahama Is.
Cubanops darlingtoni (Bryant, 1948) – Hispaniola
Cubanops granpiedra Sánchez-Ruiz, Platnick & Dupérré, 2010 – Cuba
Cubanops juragua Sánchez-Ruiz, Platnick & Dupérré, 2010 – Cuba
Cubanops ludovicorum (Alayón, 1976) (type) – Cuba
Cubanops luquillo Sánchez-Ruiz, Brescovit & Alayón, 2015 – Puerto Rico
Cubanops terueli Sánchez-Ruiz, Platnick & Dupérré, 2010 – Cuba
Cubanops tortuguilla Sánchez-Ruiz, Platnick & Dupérré, 2010 – Cuba
Cubanops vega Sánchez-Ruiz, Platnick & Dupérré, 2010 – Hispaniola

Gallery

References 

Caponiidae
Araneomorphae genera
Spiders of the Caribbean